"Believe Me" is a song recorded by American singer-songwriter Usher for his eighth studio album, Flawed. It was produced by Mike Will Made It, and released on September 5, 2014 through SoundCloud and the singer's VEVO channel. "Believe Me" is an "emotional" uptempo ballad, where the lyrics revolve around Usher betraying his lover's trust and being left with the guilt.

Production and release 
On August 24, 2014 Usher performed "She Came to Give It to You" during the 2014 MTV Video Music Awards, with rapper Nicki Minaj. The same day, "Believe Me" was released on MTV as a track from his eighth studio album Flawed (2016). It was later released through SoundCloud and the singer's VEVO channel on September 5.

"Believe Me" was produced by Mike Will Made It, and has a running duration of four minutes and four seconds. It is an "emotional" uptempo ballad, where Usher sings about "betraying his girl’s trust and being left with the guilt." The song combines the genres of EDM and pop, with R&B over-tones through Usher's falsetto. The song utilities synthesizers which "punctuates" and a "thumping" bass.

References

Usher (musician) songs
2014 songs
Songs written by Usher (musician)